New Tripoli is an unincorporated community and census-designated place (CDP) in Lynn Township in Lehigh County, Pennsylvania. As of the 2020 census, the population was 840. New Tripoli is part of the Lehigh Valley, which had a population of 861,899 and was the 68th most populous metropolitan area in the U.S. as of the 2020 census.

The name comes from Tripoli in Libya, in commemoration of the fighting in the Barbary Wars. The pronunciation of New Tripoli is with the stress on "PO", as many non-natives make the mistake of stressing the first syllable which will often be corrected by natives. The New Tripoli ZIP Code is 18066 and it is in area code 610, exchange 298.

Geography
The village is located at the intersection of Madison Street and Pennsylvania Route 143 near Pennsylvania Route 309 on the northern edge of the Lehigh Valley region of Pennsylvania. It is in northwestern Lehigh County, in the eastern part of Lynn Township. PA 143 leads east  to PA 309 and southwest  to Kempton. PA 309 leads southeast  to the west side of the Allentown area and northwest across Blue Mountain  to Tamaqua.

School Creek flows westward through the north side of town, joining Ontelaunee Creek just west of the CDP border. Water runoff from the town flows via School Creek, Ontelaunee Creek, and Maiden Creek to the Schuylkill River, part of the Delaware River watershed.

Education
The village is served by Northwestern Lehigh School District, which is located in New Tripoli.

References

External links

Census-designated places in Lehigh County, Pennsylvania
Census-designated places in Pennsylvania